The following is a list of artists who have had recordings with MCA Records.
For MCA Records' country music artists, see List of MCA Nashville artists.
As MCA reissued recordings previously released on other labels, only artists whose recordings were first issued on the MCA label are listed here.

0-9
1:43 (MCA Music Philippines)

A
A Music Theory (MCA Music Philippines) 
Adam Ant
Afternoon Delights
Johnny Alegre (MCA Music Philippines)
All About Eve (MCA UK; Ultraviolet only)
Allure
Alvin and the Chipmunks
Andy Summers
The Angels / Angel City
 Anthony Hamilton (Uptown/MCA)
Aqua
A*Teens
Autograph (Russian band)
Avant (Magic Johnson Music/MCA)
Axe
Akina Nakamori (Japanese singer)

B
Bang Tango
Richard Barone
Bell Biv DeVoe
Regina Belle
Beijing Spring
Birtha (from ABC/Dunhill)
Blackalicious (Quannum Projects/MCA)
Black Grape
Bobby "Blue" Bland (from ABC)
The Blessing
Mary J. Blige (Uptown/MCA)
Best Kissers In The World
Blue Tears
Body
Boston
The Bottles
Boulevard
Box Car Racer
Boys Club
Bobby Brown
Breakfast Club
Budgie
Jimmy Buffett (from ABC)
Cindy Bullens (1989 album)
Blink-182

C
The Call
Cambio (MCA Music Philippines)
Camel
The Cardigans (US and Canada)
Belinda Carlisle (US and Canada)
Tony Carey
Larry Carlton
Kim Carnes
Oliver Cheatham
Cher (from Kapp)
Chicosci (MCA Music Philippines)
The Chipettes
The Clarks
Cold Sweat
Colosseum II
Common
Alice Cooper
Bernadette Cooper
Bill Cosby
Cowboy Mouth
Crimson Glory (MCA/Roadrunner)
The Crusaders (from Blue Thumb)
The Cuff Links (outside North America)
Cosmic Slop Shop

D
Darren Espanto (MCA Music Philippines)
Darwins Waiting Room
Mac Davis
The Dawn (MCA Music Philippines)
Destination (Butterfly)
Dig
Dog House
Donna De Lory
Lyndsey de Paul
Kiki Dee (Rocket/MCA) (US/Canada)
Diamond Head
Neil Diamond (from Uni)
Joe Dolce
DoubleDrive
Ronnie Dove
Dream Theater (Mechanic/MCA)
Dianne Elise (MCA Music Philippines)
The Damned
The Dramatics

E
E.Y.C. 
Miguel Escueta (MCA Music Philippines)
Elha Mae Nympha (MCA Music Philippines)
Sheena Easton
Eric B. & Rakim
E 40

F
Harold Faltermeyer
Familiar 48
Fela Kuti
Fenix TX (Drive-Thru/MCA)
Femme Fatale
Finch (Drive-Thru/MCA)
Fine Young Cannibals (IRS/MCA, US and Canada)
Fist
The Fixx
The Floaters (from ABC)
Flotsam and Jetsam
Glenn Frey
Frou Frou
Pops Fernandez (MCA Music Philippines)

G
Barry Gibb (US)
Giuffria
Genesis (US/Canada)
Geordie (US/Canada)
Roland Gift
GP Wu
Gregory Gray
Mick Greenwood
Guy (Uptown/MCA)
Guy Mann-Dude
GZA (Wu-Tang/MCA)

H
H2O
Aaron Hall (Silas/MCA)
Damion Hall (Silas/MCA)
Anthony Hamilton (Uptown/MCA)
Hardline
Headpins
Heavy D. & The Boyz (Uptown/MCA)
Carly Hennessey 
Rupert Holmes (from Infinity)
The Hooters
James Horner
Grayson Hugh

I
II D Extreme (Gasoline Alley/MCA)
Immature
Indecent Obsession
Iron Butterfly
Donnie Iris
IV Xample

J
 Jody Watley 
J Dilla
Jetboy
The Jets
The Jimi Hendrix Experience
Jodeci (Uptown/MCA)
Elton John (US and Canada only, from Uni)
Holly Johnson
Steve Jones
JK Labajo (MCA Music Philippines)
Julianne (MCA Music Philippines)
July For Kings
Jump in the Water
Justice System
Jersey Ave.

K
K-Ci & JoJo
Bert Kaempfert (US and Canada only, from Decca)
Kansas
Kardinal Offishall
Keel (MCA/Gold Mountain)
Joan Kennedy (Canada only)
Nik Kershaw
Kid Brother
Kill For Thrills
B.B. King (from ABC)
Klymaxx
Gladys Knight
Krokus
Femi Kuti

L 
Patti LaBelle
Law and Order
Joey Lawrence (Impact/MCA) (US/Canada)
Leapy Lee (outside North America)
Barrington Levy
Lillian Axe
Little Milton
London
The Look
Loose Ends (Virgin/MCA)
Loretta Lynn (MCA Nashville)
Lord Tracy (MCA/Uni Records)
Love Club (MCA/Popular Metaphysics)
Lynyrd Skynyrd
Lyle Lovett

M
M (outside the US and Canada)
The Mamas & The Papas
Barbara Mandrell (MCA Nashville)
Manitoba's Wild Kingdom (MCA/Popular Metaphysics)
Jimmy Martin
Jason McCoy (Canada only)
Meat Loaf (US and Canada only)
Glenn Medeiros
Men Without Hats (Backstreet/MCA) (US)
Michael Learns To Rock (Impact Music, 1991)
Midtown (Drive-Thru/MCA)
Stephanie Mills
Dannii Minogue
Mint Royale (US only)
Bill Monroe
Chanté Moore (Silas/MCA)
Gary Moore (outside the US and Canada)
Alanis Morissette (Canada only)
Steve Morse
Moulin Rouge (ABC)
Musical Youth
Monique
Mystikal

N
New Edition
New Found Glory (Drive-Thru/MCA)
New Radicals
The New Style, would later change their name to Naughty by Nature after leaving MCA
Olivia Newton-John (US and Canada only, from Uni)
Ricky Nelson (from Decca)
Martin Nievera (MCA Music Philippines, now moved to PolyEast Records)
Night Ranger
The Nixons
Nonpoint

O 
Oingo Boingo
The Osborne Brothers
Osibisa
The Outfield

P
Paparazzi
Parental Advisory (Savvy/MCA)
Passionate Friends
Rahsaan Patterson
Pebbles
Perfect Crime (band)
The Joe Perry Project
Tom Petty and the Heartbreakers (Backstreet/MCA, from ABC)
Pitchshifter
Poco (from ABC)
Richard Poon (MCA Music Philippines)
Jesse Powell (Silas/MCA)
Pretty Boy Floyd
Puya

Q
Quartz

R
Raffi (Troubadour/Shoreline/Rounder/MCA)
Rare Bird (ABC/Command/Probe, US only)
Raven-Symoné
Ready for the World
Helen Reddy
Riff Regan
Cliff Richard (Rocket/MCA, US only)
Kane Roberts
The Roots
Rebekah Ryan

S
Sabrina (MCA Music Philippines)
Buffy Sainte-Marie
Santa Cruz
Telly Savalas
Neil Sedaka (Rocket/MCA)
Semisonic
Charlie Sexton
Shaggy
Shai
Cybill Shepherd
Shy (Shy England in U.S.)
Side A (MCA Music Philippines)
Something Corporate (Drive-Thru/MCA) 
Sonny
Sonny and Cher
Soul for Real
Sound Barrier 
SouthFM
Spinal Tap
SpeedBall Baby (Fort Apache/MCA)
Spread Eagle
Spyro Gyra
Stackridge (from Decca)
Brenda K. Starr
Steelheart
Steely Dan (from ABC)
Stone Fury
Sublime (Gasoline Alley/MCA)
Sweet F.A.

T
Talib Kweli (Rawkus/MCA)
Tangerine Dream
Tanya Markova (MCA Music Philippines)
Andy Taylor
Kari Taylor
Phil Thornalley
Tiffany
The Tragically Hip
Ralph Tresvant
Triumph
Trixter  (Mechanic/MCA)
Tanya Tucker 
Twisted Method
Conway Twitty
Tygers of Pan Tang
Tim Stines

U
 Tracey Ullman (Stiff/MCA) (US/Canada)

V
Voices
Voivod

W
Jody Watley
Water 
What Is This?
The Who (US and Canada only, from Decca)
Whycliffe
Kim Wilde
Will and the Kill
John Williams
Jackie Wilson (outside North America)
Vickie Winans
Windjammer
Wire Train
Wishbone Ash (from Decca)
World Entertainment War (MCA/Popular Metaphysics)
Kitty Wells (from Decca)

X

Y
Young Black Teenagers

References

MCA